Jack Clark (born 26 September 1994) is an English former first-class cricketer.

Clark was born at Ashington and educated at The King Edward VI School, Morpeth. From there he attended the Durham University School of Engineering and Computing Sciences. Clark debuted in minor counties cricket for Northumberland in the 2013 MCCA Knockout Trophy. He played minor counties cricket for Northumberland until 2015, making four appearances each in the Minor Counties Championship and the MCCA Knockout Trophy. While studying at Durham University, Clark played first-class cricket for Durham MCCU, debuting against Gloucestershire at Bristol. Clark played first-class cricket for Durham MCCU until 2017, making four appearances. He scored 76 runs in these matches, with a high score of 32.

References

External links

1994 births
Living people
Sportspeople from Ashington
Cricketers from Northumberland
Alumni of Durham University
English cricketers
Northumberland cricketers
Durham MCCU cricketers